is a public park located in Ota ward, Tokyo, Japan. It contains two ancient kofun burial mounds. It contains a number of cherry blossom trees and is also well known for its large number of hydrangea trees.

References

Parks and gardens in Tokyo
Hanami spots of Japan
Ōta, Tokyo